Security Management is the monthly magazine of ASIS International (formerly the American Society for Industrial Security). It was launched in 1972. The publication combines featured articles on topics such as terrorism and corporate espionage, with staff-written departments covering news and trends, homeland security, IT security, and legal developments. The magazine is based in Alexandria, Virginia.

References

External links
 SecurityManagement.com

Business magazines published in the United States
Monthly magazines published in the United States
Magazines established in 1972
Magazines published in Virginia